Storm King may refer to:

Places

Australia 

 Storm King, Queensland, a locality in the Southern Downs Region
 Storm King Dam, a dam in the Southern Downs Region, Queensland

United States 

 Storm King Art Center, in New York
 Storm King Highway, in New York
 Storm King Mountain (New York)
 Storm King School, in New York
 Storm King State Park, in New York
 Storm King Ranger Station, in Washington
 Mount Storm King, in Washington

Vehicles
 USS Storm King (AP-171), a US Naval vessel of the Storm King Class
 Storm King, a GWR 3031 Class locomotive built for and run on Great Western Railway between 1891 and 1915
 Storm King, a ferry operated on Lake Crescent, Washington from 1915 to 1922

Other 
 nickname of James Pollard Espy
 Storm King Press, founded near Storm King Mountain (New York)
 The Storm King, a fictional character in the 2017 film My Little Pony: The Movie
 Storm King, an indie speedmetal band established in Pittsburgh, Pennsylvania
 The Storm King, the final boss of Fortnite: Save the World, and a boss fight in Fortnite: Battle Royale
 The Storm King, a fictional title in Girl Genius.

See also 

 Storm King Mountain (disambiguation)